The demographics of Rawalpindi District, a district of Punjab in Pakistan, has undergone significant changes over the years. It has been affected by turmoil in the surrounding districts.

1901 census 
The 1901 census was carried out during the period of British rule. The population of the district in 1901 was 558,699, and the area of the district at the time was 6,192 square kilometres.

The main Hindu tribes of Rawalpindi district were Brahmins ( particularly Mohyal Sarswat Brahmins) and Khatris.

The main Muslim tribes after some of the Hindu Tribes of Rawalpindi District some converted to Islam were the Chauhans, Awans, Abbassi, Dhanyals, Gakhars, Gujjars, Jats, Kashmiris, Khattar, Paracha, Rajputs, Pathans,and Sayyid.

According to the census of 1901, the population of the main tribes were: Awan (38,768), Dhund Abbasis (23,462), Gakhars (13,328), Gujjars (25,953), Janjua Rajputs (7,557), Jats (34,556), Khattar (1,014). Miscellaneous Dhanyal (3,991), Satti (5,343) and Sayyid(12,508) were also present.

1941 census 

According to the 1941 Indian census Muslims numbered around 628,913, at 80% of the total population, while Hindus and Sikhs numbered 82,178 (10.50%) and 64,127 (8.17%) respectively.

After independence 
The predominantly Muslim population supported the Muslim League and Pakistan Movement.  

After the independence of Pakistan in 1947, the minority Hindus and Sikhs migrated to India while the Muslim refugees from India settled in the Rawalpindi District. Kashmir and other areas arrived in Rawalpindi. 

While it is accepted that the population of urban Rawalpindi has been transformed since independence, the rural population in the Kahuta, Kallar Syedan, Kotli Sattian, Gujar Khan and Murree Tehsils are still overwhelmingly populated by the tribes referred to in the 1901  census.

1998 census 
According to the 1998 census the population of the district was 3,363,911 of which 53.03% were urban. 

At the time of the 1998 census of Pakistan, the following were the demographics of the Rawalpindi district, by first language:
 Punjabi: %
 Urdu: 3.5%
 Pashto: 4.3%
 Others: approx. 2.2%

2017 census 
In the 2017 census the population of the district was 5,405,633 of which 54.% were urban, making Rawalpindi the second most urbanised district in Punjab.

Also at the time of the 2017 Census of Pakistan, the distribution of the population of Rawalpindi District by first language was as follows:
 68.7% Punjabi
 10.9% Pashto
 10.2% Urdu
 3.2% Hindko
 1.8% Kashmiri
 1.0% Saraiki
 0.2% Sindhi
 0.1% Brahui
 0.1% Balochi
 4.0% Others

See also

 Tribes and clans of the Pothohar Plateau

References

Rawalpindi
Rawalpindi District